Brookville Township is one of thirteen townships in Franklin County, Indiana. As of the 2010 census, its population was 5,773.

Geography

Cities and towns
 Brookville (the county seat)

Unincorporated towns
 Mound Haven
 Stavetown
 Whitcomb
 Yellow Bank
 Youngs Corner
(This list is based on USGS data and may include former settlements.)

Adjacent townships
 Fairfield Township (north)
 Bath Township (northeast)
 Springfield Township (east)
 Whitewater Township (southeast)
 Highland Township (south)
 Butler Township (southwest)
 Metamora Township (west)
 Blooming Grove Township (northwest)

Major highways
 U.S. Route 52
 Indiana State Road 1
 Indiana State Road 101
 Indiana State Road 252

Cemeteries
The township contains three cemeteries: Maple Grove, Saint Michaels and Usher.

Education
Brookville Township residents may obtain a free library card from the Franklin County Public Library District in Brookville.

References
 
 United States Census Bureau cartographic boundary files

External links
 Indiana Township Association
 United Township Association of Indiana

Townships in Franklin County, Indiana
Townships in Indiana